Freesia leichtlinii is a species of herb in the family Iridaceae.

Sources

References 

leichtlinii